Wiesław Kazimierz Binienda (born 20 August 1956 in Koło, Poland) is a Polish-American scientist, PhD, and professor and chairman of the Department of Civil Engineering at the University of Akron.

Binienda's research includes impact simulation, fracture and damage of advanced composite materials, explicit and implicit finite element mechanics, smart materials, structural design and optimization, characterization and constitutive equation development for ceramic matrix, metal matrix and polymer matrix composites. He received the 2002 College of Engineering Outstanding Researcher Award in recognition of his research accomplishments. He has authored or coauthored 2 books, 46 journal papers, 73 conference publications and 70 presentations.

Dr. Binienda was the lead scientist who questioned and investigated the 2010 Polish Air Force Tu-154 crash. His findings were in direct contradiction to reports published by the official Russian and Polish air crash investigation bodies.

Shortly after his findings were published, it was revealed that his simulation results were just a reprint of a paper by one of his students.   After government change in 2015, the new Polish government - which previously openly promoted conspiracy theories regarding the crash - has opened a new investigation, inviting and hiring Binienda , despite him having no prior experience with air crash investigations.

Binienda and his wife Maria Szonert-Binienda are also involved in research and education about war crimes committed by Soviet Army against Polish soldiers in Katyn massacre.

Biography 
Binienda received his Ph. D. in Mechanical Engineering from Drexel University in 1987, his M.S. in Mechanical Engineering from Drexel University in 1985, his M.S. in Motor Vehicles, and Heavy Duty Machines from Warsaw Technical University in 1980. Binienda is also involved in research projects with NASA.

Academic work 
Professor and Chair Civil Engineering Department University of Akron 
Expert of the Steering Committee of US President Council of Advisors of Science under Advanced Manufacturing Initiative AMP 
Member of Supercomputing Committee, Ohio Supercomputer Center 
Member of Resource Committee, Ohio Supercomputer Center
Member of Software Committee, Ohio Supercomputer Center

Current research 
Analysis of the Polish Governmental Plane Crash in Smolensk, Russia, on 10 April 2010
Status Report on Smolensk Crash
High Velocity Impact on Composite Structures (Laminates, Braided Fabrics and Composites) 
Characterization of Aging Influence on Braided Composites
Fracture mechanics and damage growth in composite materials 
Stress and deformation analysis in FRP, MMC, BMC and rubber composite materials 
Filament winding process development and analysis 
Explicit FEA of Composite Structures – Impact Perforation Analysis 
Nano-coating processing and analysis 
Application of Advanced Composites for Retrofitting of Concrete Structures 
Functionally Graded Layers Analysis
Research Facilities and Research Group
High Velocity Impact Lab (Gas Gun; Aramis System; Shearography Vacuum Chamber for NDE, Aging Chamber, MTS, etc.)
Computing software (ABAQUS, ANSYS, LS-DYNA, PATRAN etc.)

Publications 
NASA Publications
W.K. Binienda, D.N. Robinson, S.M. Arnold and P.A. Bartolotta, "A Creep Model for Metallic Composites Based on Matrix Testing: Application to Kanthal Composites," NASA TM 103172, 1989.
D.N. Robinson, W.K. Binienda and M. Miti-Kavuma, "Creep and Creep Rupture of Strongly Reinforced Metallic Composites," NASA TR 185286, 1989.
W.K. Binienda, S.M. Arnold and H.Q Tan, "Calculation of Stress Intensity Factors in an Isotropic Multi-C racked Plate: Part I – Theoretical Development," NASA TM 1 05766, 1992.
S.M. Arnold, W.K. Binienda, H.Q. Tan and M.H. Xu, "Calculation of Stress Intensity Factors in an Isotropic Multi-Cracked Plate: Part II – Symbolic/Numeric Implementation," NASA TM 105823, 1992.
W.K. Binienda and S.M. Arnold, "Driving Force Analysis in an Infinite Anisotropic Plate with Multiple Crack Interactions," NASA TM 106838, January 1995.

Other Publications 
 Mixed-Mode Fracture of Uniaxial Fiber Reinforced Composites, Defense Technical Information Center 1987 (współautorzy: A. S. Wang, E. S. Reddy, Y. Zhong)
 A Comprehensive Study on Damage Tolerance Properties of Notched Composite Laminates, Defense Technical Information Center 1988 (współautorzy: A. S. Wang, E. S. Reddy, U. Zhong)
 Frictionless Contact of Multilayered Composite Half Planes Containing Layers With Complex Eigenvalues, NASA Lewis Research Center 1997 (współautorzy: Wang Zhang, Marek-Jerzy Pindera)
 Analysis of an Interface Crack for a Functionally Graded Strip Sandwiched Between Two Homogeneous Layers of Finite Thickness, NASA Lewis Research Center 1999 (współautor: N. I. Shbeeb)
 Analysis of Multiple Cracks in an Infinite Functionally Graded Plate, NASA Lewis Research Center 1999 (współautorzy: N. I. Shbeeb, K. L. Kreider)
 Composite Materials and Analysis Techniques for Aerospace Application, ASCE, Aerospace Division 2002 (współautor: Marek-Jerzy Pindera)
 Advanced Materials and Structures in Civil and Aerospace Engineering, ASCE 2005
 Earth and Space 2006 – Engineering, Construction, and Operations in Challenging Environments, ASCE 2006 (red., współredaktorzy: R. B. Malla, A. K. Maji)
 Impact Mechanics of Composite Materials for Aerospace Application, ASCE 2008 (współautor: Pizhong Qiao)
 Earth and Space 2008 – Engineering, Science, Construction, and Operations in Challenging Environments, ASCE 2008 (red.)

Membership 
 ASME (American Society of Mechanical Engineers)
 ASCE (American Society of Civil Engineers; Fellow)
 AIAA (American Institute of Aeronautics and Astronautics)
 SAMPE (Society for the Advancement of Material and Process Engineering)
 Member of Lawrence Livermore National Laboratory Collaborator's Program
 Computational Mechanics (The University of Akron)

Bibliography 
 Biografia na stronie Kolegium Inżynierii University of Akron uakron.edu
 Profil na stronach Wydziału Inżynierii Cywilnej (Department of Civil Engineering) Kolegium Inżynierii University of Akron ecgf.uakron.edu

References

External links 
 
 

1956 births
People from Koło County
Polish emigrants to the United States
University of Akron faculty
Drexel University alumni
University of Warsaw alumni
Polish engineers
Living people